St Joseph's Industrial School may refer to:

 St Joseph's Industrial School, Clonmel, South Tipperary, Ireland
 St Joseph's Industrial School, Dundalk, County Louth, Ireland
 St Joseph's Industrial School, Letterfrack, County Galway, Ireland
 St Joseph's Industrial School, Salthill, County Galway, Ireland
 St Joseph's Industrial School, Tralee, County Kerry, Ireland
 St Joseph's Industrial School, Glin, County Limerick, Ireland
 St. Joseph's Industrial School, 1896–1972, Clayton, Kent County, Delaware, U.S.
 St. Joseph's Industrial School, 1897–1917,  Notre Dame, Indiana, U.S.